Abdurahman Nasser (Arabic:عبد الرحمن ناصر) (born 16 February 1991) is a Qatari footballer who played in the Qatar Stars League for Al Sadd.

References

Qatari footballers
1991 births
Living people
Al Sadd SC players
Muaither SC players
Qatari people of Yemeni descent
Qatar Stars League players
Qatari Second Division players
Association football defenders